Chin Young (born 23 October 1950) is a South Korean politician in the liberal Democratic Party of Korea, and a former member of the National Assembly representing Yongsan, Seoul. He was formerly a member of the conservative Saenuri Party, and served as the first Minister of Health and Welfare in the Park Geun-hye administration from March to September 2013.

Early life and career 
Chin studied law as an undergraduate at Seoul National University, graduating in 1975, and attained a masters from the University of Washington School of Law in 1984. He served as a judge on the Seoul Southern District Court from 1980 to 1981, and worked as a private lawyer from 1981 to 2007.

Political career

National Assembly (Saenuri Party, 2004–2016) 
Chin was first elected to the 17th National Assembly in 2004. He was re-elected twice more in 2008 and 2012 as a member of the conservative Saenuri Party.

Minister of Health and Welfare (2013) 
Chin was the Minister of Health and Welfare in Park Geun-hye administration. Having previously been Park's chief secretary, he was considered a key ally of Park at the time, and advocated an expansion of government welfare spending. He resigned six months after his appointment due to the administration's refusal to fulfil an election pledge to provide an additional monthly allowance for elderly citizens. Later, in May 2014, Chin voiced his disapproval that he had not been allowed "to leave quietly".

National Assembly (Minjoo Party, 2016–2020) 
In March 2016, Chin was one of a number of Saenuri heavyweights who were denied party nominations for the April 13 parliamentary election. He left the party in response, and joined the opposition Minjoo Party. At a press conference with Minjoo leader Kim Chong-in announcing his defection, Chin stated that he "cherished true party politics, not party factionalism masterminded by a certain person", and that he had joined the Minjoo Party to "fight against authoritarianism to restore democracy". His comment was interpreted as an attack on Park Geun-hye. In the event, Chin was re-elected in Yongsan for his fourth legislative term in the 20th National Assembly, defeating Saenuri challenger Hwang Chun-ja.

References

1950 births
Interior ministers of South Korea
Living people
Members of the National Assembly (South Korea)
Minjoo Party of Korea politicians
People from Damyang County
Liberty Korea Party politicians
Seoul National University School of Law alumni
South Korean judges
University of Washington School of Law alumni
Yeoyang Jin clan
Health and Welfare ministers of South Korea
21st-century South Korean politicians